Karadayı is a Turkish television drama series produced by Ay Yapım and broadcast on ATV. It was directed by Uluç Bayraktar (who also directed Ezel). It originally aired on 8 October 2012 in Turkey. It stars Kenan İmirzalıoğlu as Mahir Kara and Bergüzar Korel as Feride Şadoğlu.

Concept of Karadayı
The word "Karadayı" is a combination of the series' protagonist Mahir Kara's last name and the Turkish word "dayı", which means "uncle" - specifically a mother's brother.
Karadayı, meaning "Uncle Kara" is how Mahir's nephew, Nazif Tiryaki, addresses his uncle. The word also resembles the Turkish word "kabadayı", which means gangster. After the death of Mahir's nephew and his decision to become an insider amongst the mafia in order to avenge his nephew, he refers to himself as "Karadayı" and this becomes his nickname in the mafia world.

Synopsis
Mahir fights for justice. He wants to get his father, Nazif Kara, out of jail. While he joins the court of Istanbul as a trainee lawyer to fight his father's case, fate finds him taking its own course. He stands at a crossroads where he must choose between Feride, the judge of his father's case, and his father.

This fascinating story unfolds as it takes you back to the magical Istanbul of the 1970s with all its charm and mysticality. The city of Istanbul is beautifully portrayed to depict the historical splendor of the place and its enchanting people.

Episodes

Critical appreciation
Oscar winner Hollywood star Russell Crowe, said that he is amazed by the Karadayı series. He said that he likes to follow it and that he's fallen in love with Bergüzar Korel. "She can do great things in Hollywood", he added.

Cast

Awards

The major award (often dubbed as the Turkish Oscars), the Altın Kelebek (Golden Butterfly awards), Karadayi won it in 5 different categories.
Karadayi also got nomination in International Emmy Awards, 2014. Along with the nominations of lead actors Kenan İmirzalıoğlu and Bergüzar Korel.

External links

References

2012 Turkish television series debuts
Turkish crime drama television series
Turkish drama television series
Television series by Ay Yapım
Urdu 1 original programming
ATV (Turkey) original programming
Television shows set in Istanbul
Television series produced in Istanbul
Television series set in the 2010s